The 2007 Gael Linn Cup, the most important representative competition for elite level participants in the women's team field sport of camogie, was won by Ulster, who defeated Leinster in the final, played at Russell Park.

Arrangements
Ulster defeated Munster by 4–9 to 2–10 at Russell Park while Leinster received a walkover from Connacht. Ulster then defeated the holders, Leinster, by 2–12 to 3–8 and ended a 40-year wait for their second Gael-Linn title. Despite scoring an 18th-minute goal Leinster trailed by 0–11 to 1–4 at half time and it was the good work of the player of the tournament, Antrim's Jane Adams, Derry's Sinead Cassidy and Katie McAuley, along with Down players Fionnuala Carr and Moya McGinn, which resulted in victory.>

Gael Linn Trophy
Leinster's Junior side made amends for the defeat of their Senior counterparts with a 3–16 to 0–11 win over Munster. Leinster led 1–6 to 0–7 at half-time, but were very impressive after the restart, with Laois's Louise Mahony scoring 1–10, enough to win the Player of the Tournament award. 
Kilkenny's Anne Farrell and Pauline Comerford along with Westmeath's Pamela Greville and Meath's Lizzy Lynch and Jane Dolan also made vital contributions. Waterford's Áine Lyng scored 0–8 for Munster, while Sharon McMahon and Sally Anne O'Grady were also among the scorers.

Final stages

|}

Junior Final

|}

References

External links
 Camogie Association

2007 in camogie
2007
Cam